Dimas Ekky Pratama (born 26 October 1992) is an Indonesian motorcycle racer who last raced in CEV Moto2 European Championship for Pertamina Mandalika SAG Stylobike Euvic Team.

Career

Early career
His racing career started in 2010, where he competed in IRS (Indonesian Racing Series) Supersport 600cc class. In his maiden season, he achieved 4th in the final standings, 5th in 2011, and concluded his national level career as a runner-up in 2012.

Suzuka 4 & 8 Hours
Pratama won the 2013 Suzuka 4 Hours race together with fellow Indonesian rider Iswandi Muis, both riding a Honda CBR600RR bike from Astra Honda Racing Team. He had also participated in the higher class, Suzuka 8 Hours between 2014 and 2017. He raced for Honda Team Asia, aboard a Honda CBR1000RR together with Australian Joshua Hook and Malaysian Mohamad Zamri Baba in his first participation of the event where the trio finished 7th overall. The 2015 race saw a major change to the team as they replaced Dimas' partners with Azlan Shah Kamaruzaman from Malaysia, and Thai rider Ratthapong Wilairot. They completed the race in the 18th position. For the 2016 event, the team replaced Azlan with Zaqhwan Zaidi and finished 8th, an achievement that was repeated for the following year with the same line-up.

Asia Road Racing Championship
From the year 2012 to 2016 he raced in Asia Road Racing Championship in the Supersport 600cc class as a full-time rider, also with Astra Honda Racing Team, and a one-off appearance at 2017 Indonesian Round at Sentul which he won the first race. During his time in the class, he earned the Best Rookie of The Year in his first season, having finished the championship in 6th position. His best ranking position ever was 5th in the 2015 season.

CEV Moto2 European Championship
Between 2015 and 2018 Pratama competed in the FIM CEV Moto2 European Championship with Astra Honda Racing Team. His best overall result was 5th in 2018 season, and a total of 2 podium finishes in Catalunya race 1 in 2017 season (3rd) and race 1 Albacete round in 2018 (3rd).

Moto2 World Championship
He made his Grand Prix racing debut as a wildcard at the Malaysian GP in 2017 at Sepang International Circuit. Unfortunately, he was unable to finish the race as he was involved in a crash. A year later, at the same circuit, he was called up by Tech 3 to replace their regular rider, Bo Bendsneyder, who was absent due to injury. Pratama completed the race in 23rd position. He also participated in 2018 Catalan motorcycle Grand Prix as a wildcard, where he finished in 24th position.

He secured a full-season contract to race in the 2019 Moto2 season for Hiroshi Aoyama's IDEMITSU Honda Team Asia. In Spanish round at Circuito de Jerez, he was accidentally ran over by other rider in the beginning of the race after crashing, and did not make restart. Later, during Free Practice 1 for TT Assen, he crashed heavily and suffered concussions where he was confirmed unfit for the race. He participated in the next two rounds, but also withdrew after taking part in the Free Practice sessions. 

He was also absent for 4 rounds due to recovery from his injuries and was replaced by Teppei Nagoe at Red Bull Ring and Silverstone, Andi Farid Izdihar at Misano round, and Gerry Salim at Aragon. He made his comeback after 4 months absent at Buriram and reached his best result of the season at Sepang as he finished 18th. His contract was not renewed and he was replaced by Farid for 2020 season.

Mandalika Racing Team 
After spending a year without a ride, Pratama was approached by Mandalika Racing Team, a project led by Kemal Nasution and People's Representative Council of Indonesia member Rapsel Ali in aim to contest for 2021 season. The project initially was intended to form a new team in Moto2 class, but eventually switched to become a partner of Stop and Go (SAG) Racing, an existing team. However, Dorna Sports, FIM, and IRTA advised him to compete in CEV Moto2, considering his racing records. The seat in the team was finally filled by Bo Bendsneyder, who had to cancel his newly-signed contract at EAB Racing in World Supersport 600 class in order to join the team.  Pratama still served as a reserve rider in the team and had possible wildcard entries. His chance eventually came as he was given a wildcard entry at 2021 Valencian GP. However he crashed on lap 14 and did not finish.

Return to CEV Moto2 
Being unable to secure his full season Moto2 participation, Pratama raced in 2021 CEV Moto2 with SAG Racing, which marked his comeback to the championship since 2018.

Personal life
Pratama is married and has two children. His nickname is "Red Forehead". He is endorsed by HJC Helmets since 2021, having previously been associated with KYT his whole career.

Career statistics

FIM CEV Moto2 European Championship

Races by year
(key) (Races in bold indicate pole position, races in italics indicate fastest lap)

Grand Prix motorcycle racing

By season

By class

Races by year
(key) (Races in bold indicate pole position; races in italics indicate fastest lap)

References

External links

1992 births
Living people
People from Depok
Indonesian Muslims
Indonesian motorcycle racers
Moto2 World Championship riders